Alida Ferry Rockefeller Messinger (born 1948) is an American philanthropist and the youngest daughter of John Davison Rockefeller III.

Early life and family
Messinger was born in 1948. She is the youngest daughter of John Davison Rockefeller III (1906–78) and Blanchette Ferry Hooker (1909–92), and a fourth-generation member of the Rockefeller family. Her brother is former Senator John Davison "Jay" Rockefeller IV (born 1937).

Messinger's father began to teach her about philanthropy when she was five years old. She has said, "My father and mother's greatest fear was that their four children might take their wealth for granted and grow up spoiled and arrogant ... They wanted us to learn early that with wealth comes responsibility."

Philanthropy
Messinger is a major donor to conservation and environmental organizations. Her Alida R. Messinger Charitable Trust also funds conservation and environmental groups, as does the Rockefeller Family Fund, founded in 1967, of which she is a trustee.

Messinger also contributes financially to the Center for Public Integrity. She gave over a million dollars to 527 Democratic-leaning organizations in 2004.

Personal life
In 1978, she married Mark Dayton (b. 1947), the son of Bruce Dayton, who was part of a family that started the retail store that eventually became Target. Dayton later served as a United States senator for Minnesota from 2001 until 2007 and as Governor of Minnesota from 2011 to 2019. Before divorcing in 1986, Messinger and Dayton had two sons together, Eric and Andrew Dayton.

After the divorce, she married William Messinger, president of Aureus, an addiction recovery organization. They have one daughter.

See also
Rockefeller family

References

1948 births
Living people
Rockefeller family
American philanthropists
Dayton family
Winthrop family